Enrico Ravetta (1864 in Milan – 1939) was an Italian painter, mainly of portraits.

He was a resident of Milan. He studied at the Brera Academy under Raffaele Casnédi and Giuseppe Bertini. Among his portraits is one of Amilcare Ponchielli.  His self-portrait is at the Galleria d'Arte Moderna, Milan.

References

1864 births
1939 deaths
19th-century Italian painters
Italian male painters
Painters from Milan
20th-century Italian painters
Brera Academy alumni
19th-century Italian male artists
20th-century Italian male artists